Matt Barnes (born July 25, 1974) is a Canadian former professional ice hockey goaltender. He is currently a goalie coach with the Rick Heinz Goalie & Hockey School.

Barnes attended Western Michigan University where he played four seasons of NCAA college hockey with the Western Michigan Broncos men's ice hockey team.

Awards and honours

References

External links

1974 births
Living people
Amstel Tijgers players
Austin Ice Bats players
Canadian ice hockey goaltenders
Central Texas Stampede players
Dayton Bombers players
Ice hockey people from Ontario
Sportspeople from Brantford
Tulsa Oilers (1992–present) players
Western Michigan Broncos men's ice hockey players
Canadian expatriate ice hockey players in the Netherlands
Canadian expatriate ice hockey players in the United States